The 1991 United States Open Cup was the 78th edition of the soccer tournament to crown the national champion of the United States. 

The Brooklyn Italians (NESSL) won the cup 1–0 against the Richardson Rockets (USISL) of Texas in a match played at Brooklyn College in Brooklyn, New York.

Bracket

Regional semifinals 
I Cambridge Faialense SC (MA) 1-3 Brooklyn Italians (NY)
I Fairfax Spartans (VA) 5-0 Vereinigung Erzgebirge (PA)
II RWB Adria (IL) W-L Fort Wayne SC (IN)
II Madison 56ers (WI) 1-0 St. Louis Scott Gallagher (MO)
III Richardson Rockets (TX) 2-0 Atlanta Datagraphic (GA)
III Galveston NASA (TX) 2-0 Wichita Falls Fever (KS)
IV Strikers (CA) 4-3 Fatigue Tech (WA)
IV New Mexico Chiles (NM) 2-0 San Jose Oaks (CA)

Regional Finals 
I  Brooklyn Italians (NY) 3-0 Fairfax Spartans (VA)
II Madison 56ers (WI)  4-4 RWB Adria (IL) RWB advance 7-6 PK's
III Richardson Rockets (TX) 8-2 FC Galveston NASA (TX)
IV New Mexico Chiles (NM) 5-0 Strikers (CA)

Semifinals 
Richardson Rockets  1-0 New Mexico Chiles
RWB Adria 1-0 Brooklyn Italians  RWB disqualified for using players not registered with the USSF. Brooklyn awarded match after protest.

Championship

References

External links
 1991 U.S.Open Cup results

U.S. Open Cup
Cup